Thor: Love and Thunder (Original Motion Picture Soundtrack) is the film score for the Marvel Studios film Thor: Love and Thunder by Michael Giacchino and Nami Melumad. The soundtrack album was released by Hollywood Records on July 6, 2022.

Background 
In December 2021, Michael Giacchino revealed that he would be scoring Love and Thunder; he previously scored Doctor Strange (2016) and the MCU Spider-Man trilogy for Marvel Studios, as well as Waititi's previous film Jojo Rabbit (2019). A soundtrack album, featuring Giacchino's original themes along with the score composed by Giacchino and Nami Melumad, was released by Hollywood Records and Marvel Music on July 6, 2022. The single "Mama's Got a Brand New Hammer", the film's main suite, was released on June 30.

Track listing
All music composed by Michael Giacchino and Nami Melumad.

Additional music
Director Taika Waititi wanted the music to reflect the same aesthetic of the film with its "bombastic, loud, colorful palette". "Sweet Child o' Mine" by Guns N' Roses is featured in the film, given Guns N' Roses is one of Waititi's favorite bands, and helped "reflect the sort of crazy adventure that we're [visually] presenting"; the song was also used in the film's marketing. Other songs featured in the film include: "Only Time" by Enya; "Welcome to the Jungle", "Paradise City", and "November Rain" by Guns N' Roses; "Fighting" by Michael Raphael; "Our Last Summer" by ABBA; "Family Affair" by Mary J. Blige; "Goodies" by Ciara featuring Petey Pablo; and "Rainbow in the Dark" by Dio. Also included is the "Old Spice Sea Chanty" by Ginger Johnson and an original song, "Hey Ninny-Nonny", performed by Waititi.

References 

2022 soundtrack albums
2020s film soundtrack albums
Marvel Cinematic Universe: Phase Four soundtracks
Thor (film series)
Michael Giacchino soundtracks